Miren Lourdes Oñederra Olaizola (born 9 June 1958) is a Basque writer and professor.

Life
Oñederra was born in San Sebastián in 1958. She studied for her first degree in Spain before taking her masters at the University of Iowa. She returned to the Basque country to take her doctorate in philology supervised by Koldo Mitxelena. She was appointed a professor in her home town in 1982.

In 1999 she published her first novel And the woman said to the serpent and this was successful and received a number of awards including the Basque Government Prize for Literature in 2000. The book has been translated into Spanish, English and Russian.

In 2014 she was a professor at the University of the Basque Country.

References

1958 births
Living people
People from San Sebastián
University of Iowa alumni
Academic staff of the University of the Basque Country
20th-century Spanish novelists
20th-century Spanish women writers
Spanish women novelists
Basque novelists
Basque women writers